Ground Zero is a 1973 American Thriller film directed and produced by James T. Flocker. The film stars Ron Casteel, John Waugh, Yvonne D'Angers, Hal Stein and Dominic Guzzo in the lead roles.

Story
Terrorists place a powerful nuclear explosive on the Golden Gate Bridge which puts the West Coast under siege.  An agent is sent in with the task to disarm the bomb.

Cast
  Ron Casteel
 Melvin Belli
 Augie Tribach
 Kim C. Friese
 John Waugh
 Yvonne D'Angers
   Hal Stein
 Dominic Guzzo
   Anthony Curcio
 Mike Maurantonio
 Lia Belli

References

External links
 
 

1973 films
1970s thriller films
Films shot in San Francisco
American thriller films
1970s English-language films
1970s American films